Wild in the Backyard is the debut studio album by American country singer-songwriter Don Henry, released in 1991 on Epic Records. It was produced by Henry and Ray Kennedy, the latter of whom also engineered the album. It was named one of the 10 best albums of 1991 by both Billboards Ken Schlager and BAMs Larry McClain. Some critics, such as Alanna Nash, compared it favorably to the music of Randy Newman.

Track listing

 No Such Love
 Into a Mall
 Mr. God
 The Same Boat
 Harley
 L. Alien
 Heart Cut in Half
 Cadillac Avenue
 White House Keys
 Beautiful Fool

Personnel
Engineering – Ray Kennedy
Producer – Don Henry, Ray Kennedy

References

Epic Records albums
Country albums by American artists
1991 debut albums